Minisport may refer to:
Mini Classic Cooper Sport, a Mini car model produced up to 2000
Mini sport utility vehicle aka Mini SUV, a class of small sport utility vehicles 
Ministry of Sport (Russia), the federal sport ministry in Russia since 2008
Spacek SD-1 Minisport, a Czech amateur-built aircraft design
Viking Minisport, a car of the 1970s
Zenith Minisport, an early CP/M laptop computer introduced by ZDS in 1989